A short swing rule restricts officers and insiders of a company from making short-term profits at the expense of the firm. It is part of United States federal securities law, and is a prophylactic measure intended to guard against so-called insider trading. The rule mandates that if an officer, director, or any shareholder holding more than 10% of outstanding shares of a publicly traded company makes a profit on a transaction with respect to the company's stock during a given six-month period, that officer, director, or shareholder must pay the difference back to the company. Note that the profit calculated is the maximum considering each pair of sales and purchases, a larger trade could be paired with trades up to six month prior as well as up to six months later and the correct calculation is a linear programming problem

As stated by a federal circuit court of appeals:

References

See also
Securities and Exchange Commission (SEC)

Corporate governance